The 2014–15 Hong Kong League Cup is the 12th edition of the Hong Kong League Cup. The Cup is contested by the 9 teams in the 2014–15 Hong Kong Premier League.

Results

Group stage

Group A

Group B

Group C

Knock-out Stage

Semi-finals

Final

External links
 Hong Kong League Cup - Hong Kong Football Association

2014–15 domestic association football cups
Lea
2014-15